Nicholas Roderick "Cook" Craig is an Australian musician, singer and songwriter and is a part of groups King Gizzard & the Lizard Wizard and the Murlocs. Craig releases music under the name Pipe-Eye.

Pipe-Eye's debut EP Cosmic Blip was released in 2015 and debut studio album Laugh About Life in April 2017, Inside/Outside in 2019 and Dream Themes in November 2021.

Solo history
Pipe-Eye's debut EP Cosmic Blip was released in 2015. The EP was recorded in his bedroom in Fairfield, Victoria. Nicholas Johnson from Brag Magazine gave the EP 4 out of 5 saying "Pipe-Eye know how to spit some serious cosmic wisdom. Then they leave you to ponder it over the course of the 30 to 60 second segue tracks that pepper the record. It adds a nice buffer to what is otherwise essentially a four-track EP by giving it a theatrical feel… It may not resonate with everyone, I'm sure some will feel cheated by the 50 per cent split between songs and noisy interludes. But it gives the songs – all of which would stand quite nicely as singles – a little bit of breathing space without the risk of adding half-baked tracks for the sake of filler."

Pipe-Eye's debut studio album Laugh About Life was written over two years and released in April 2017.
 
Pipe-Eye's second studio album Inside/Outside was released in June 2019. Jonathan Reyoso from Beat Magazine gave the album a 6.5 out of 10.

In April 2021, Pipe-Eye's re-released Cosmic Blip and Laugh About Life on limited edition LP. They debuted at numbers one and two on the ARIA Vinyl chart for the week commencing 12 April 2021.

Discography

Studio albums

Extended plays

References

Australian songwriters
21st-century Australian singers
21st-century Australian male singers
Living people
Year of birth missing (living people)
Psychedelic rock musicians
Australian rock guitarists
Australian rock singers
Australian heavy metal guitarists
People from Fairfield, Victoria
Musicians from Melbourne